Kot pri Prevaljah is a dispersed settlement in the hills south of Prevalje in the Carinthia region in northern Slovenia.

Name
The name of the settlement was changed from Kot to Kot pri Prevaljah in 1955.

References

External links
Kot pri Prevaljah on Geopedia

Populated places in the Municipality of Prevalje